Atabae is a village in the suco of Rairobo (subdistrict Atabae, Bobonaro District, East Timor).

Populated places in East Timor
Bobonaro Municipality